Why Did I Ever Say Yes Twice? is a 1969 German-Italian comedy film directed by Franz Antel and starring Lando Buzzanca, Teri Tordai and Raffaella Carrà. A railway worker has two wives, one in Munich and the other in Rome. It is also known as The Viking Who Became a Bigamist.

Main cast
 Lando Buzzanca as  Vittorio Coppa
 Teri Tordai as Ingrid
 Raffaella Carrà as  Teresa
 Peter Weck as  von Weiland
 Ann Smyrner  as  Püppi
 Jacques Herlin as  Dr. Pellegrini
 Andrea Rau  as Marisa
 Fritz Muliar as Johann
 Rainer Basedow as Alex
 Franco Giacobini  as Roberto
 Gert Wiedenhofen  as  Cesare
 Heinz Erhardt as  Weichbrodt
 Willy Millowitsch  as  Mauro Carlotti

References

External links

1969 films
1969 comedy films
German comedy films
Italian comedy films
West German films
1960s German-language films
Films directed by Franz Antel
Rail transport films
Films about polygamy
Films scored by Gianni Ferrio
1960s Italian films
1960s German films